The Royal Maintenance Corps "silah al siyana al-malaki" (سلاح الصيانة الملكي) is a branch of the Jordanian Armed Forces. It must furnish continuous operation to the field and is responsible for flow of parts, and for every vehicle being operational and ready for battle. The corps' engineers are also responsible for upgrading the tanks in use.

Role in improving the Jordanian military 
The maintenance corps role in improving Jordanian ground units, is to apply enhanced targeting systems on the M60 Patton,  the full reconstruction of several other vehicles such as the Centurion tank and to upgrade the 274 Chieftain tank  in a redesign called Khalid ibn al-Walid.
The Jordanian engineers were able to revolutionise the Challenger 1 turret system with an auto loader and a 120 mm smooth-bore gun. Maintenance specialists were sent to the United States and Britain for advanced training.

History
In 1972, the Chieftain Tank needed enhancement in order to meet changing military needs. The Corps Commander, Major General Kharabsheh, installed the new laser targeting system on several tanks including the M60. This move was revolutionary for the Jordanian military. It made it possible for the cavalry to balance power with its neighbors.

Commanders 
The king of Jordan selected the commanders of the corps. A list follows:
 Brigadier General Engineer Nael AL-Ragad 2009–present
 Major General Abdilwahab Kharabsheh ? - 1992
 Major General Mosleh AlMuthanna AlYamani 1988-1992
 Brigadier General Waleed a. Samkari 1992 - ?
 Major General Engineer Fadel Mohammed Ali 2000 - 2001

References

External links 
 Royal Jordanian maintenance corp
 Jordanian armed forces

Maintenance Corps
Military administrative corps
Military units and formations established in 1920